The KrAZ-5233 is an off-road truck 4x4 for extreme operations. It was first presented at the 2008 defence industry trade show in Kyiv. The 5322 is manufactured at the KrAZ plant in Ukraine.

Technical characteristics 
Engine: 14.86 L diesel 8 cyl. 
Power: 330 PS (243 kW) /2400rpm
Torque: 1225Nm /1225rpm
Top speed: 85 mph

Variants 
 KrAZ-5233VE "Spetsnaz" (КрАЗ-5233ВЕ "Спецназ")
 KrAZ-5233 "Raptor"
 KrAZ-MPV Shrek One - armored mine protected vehicle designed by STREIT Group on KrAZ-5233 chassis

Operators

Military operators
 
 in August 2010 KrAZ-5233 was adopted as military truck for the Ukrainian Armed Forces
 in July 2014 National Guard of Ukraine received first five KrAZ-5233 trucks. In November 2014 extra 50 KrAZ-5233 trucks were ordered for National Guard of Ukraine

  - trucks supplied in or before 2011

Civilian operators
  - in 2008 100 KrAZ-5233 were sold to Nigerian police

References

Sources 
Грузовые машины КРАЗ video (Private YouTube video)

KrAZ vehicles
Military trucks of Ukraine
Military vehicles introduced in the 2010s